The 1906 Beloit football team represented Beloit College in the 1906 college football season.  In Charles A. Fairweather's first season, Beloit compiled a 3–4–1 record, and defeated Lake Forest, Northern Illinois, and Milwaukee Medical College.

Schedule

References

Beloit
Beloit Buccaneers football seasons
1906 in sports in Wisconsin